Farrah Chaichi is an American politician and activist serving as a member of the Oregon House of Representatives for the 35th district. Elected in November 2022, she assumed office on January 9, 2023.

Education 
After graduating from Beaverton High School, Chaichi earned a Bachelor of Arts degree in criminal justice and political science from Seattle University and a Master of Professional Studies in paralegal studies from George Washington University.

Career 
As a student, Chaichi worked as a sales associate at a Dollar Tree location. She also worked in compliance for Daimler Truck before joining Stoel Rives as a client intake coordinator. Chaichi served as a member of the Beaverton Human Rights Advisory Commission from 2014 to 2019. She was elected to the Oregon House of Representatives in November 2022.

References 

Living people
Democratic Party members of the Oregon House of Representatives
Women state legislators in Oregon
People from Beaverton, Oregon
Seattle University alumni
George Washington University alumni
American politicians of Iranian descent
21st-century American politicians
21st-century American women politicians
Year of birth missing (living people)